Raspanti is a surname. Notable people with the surname include:

Antonino Raspanti (born 1959), Italian Roman Catholic bishop
Celeste Raspanti (born 1928), American playwright